Another Day is an Iraqi tragic film released in 1979.

Synopsis
The events of the film take place before the 14 July Revolution and show struggles between peasants (fellahin) and feudal lords (iqta') during the period.

Crew and cast

Crew
 Screenwriters: Sabah Atwan, Saheb Haddad, Mohamed Shukri Jameel
 Director: Saheb Haddad
 Cinematographers: Yusuf Mikael, Nihad Ali
 Music: Solhi al-Wadi
 Producers: Iraq Department of Cinema and Theatre, Adwar Moria, Anspecil Bertomo 
 Editing: Saheb Haddad

Cast
 Shaza Salem
 Bahjat Al Jubouri
 Khalil Shawki
 Awatef Naeem
 Talib Al-Furati
 Fawzi Mahdi
 Qaid Al-Nomani
 Hani Hani
 Rassem Gemayel
 Nahida Alramaah
 Salam Zahra

References

Iraqi drama films
1970s Arabic-language films